Wildlife Conservation Film Festival (WCFF) is an international film festival based in New York and Los Angeles, that promotes and produces interactive events around independent films that promote sustainability and the conservation of biodiversity. The WCFF has global partnerships in Brazil, China, Kenya and Scandinavia as of November 2019.

About WCFF

The Wildlife Conservation Film Festival was founded in 2010 by Christopher J. Gervais, FRGS at first as a 2 day event and has now grown to a 10 day festival. It is a juried event with attendees and participants that include international wildlife conservationists, filmmakers, photographers, scientists and people across the globe that work toward the preservation of global biodiversity. WCFF has a global educational outreach program with scondary and post secondary institutions in North and South America, Asia, Africa and Europe as of 2019.

2019 Award Winners

Ecosystem/Habitat: "Desert Wetlands-Pulse of the Outback" by Geoff Spanner
Education: "I Am Lion" - Tauana Films
Endangered Species: "Dammed to Extinction" Peterson Hawley Productions
Feature: "Lost Kings of Bioko" by Oliver Goetzl and Ivo Nörenberg
Foreign: "Otters and the Exotic Pet Trade" - Four Corners Film Collective and World Animal Protection
Humans & Nature - "Humans and Nature" - produced by Ian Mauro and David Suzuki
Music & Nature - "The View South: Puma's in Patagonia" produced by Richard Szikler and Manuela Iglesias
Newcomer: "Queen of Taru" - Aishwarya Sridhar
Ocean’s: "The Secret Lives of Humpbacks" Andrew Stevenson, producer
Short: "African Drivrs-Lion Lights Story" Hector Salgado and Diana Soto, producers
Wildlife Conservation: "Red Ape: Saving the Orangutan" - Offspring Films Ltd and BBC Natural World
Wildlife Crime: "The Hidden Tiger" - Rescue Doc Films

Board of Directors
Christopher J. Gervais, FRGS

Larry McCLenney, National Park Service

Board of Advisors 
Jane Alexander

Casey Anderson

Gale Brewer

Holly Marie Combs

Fabien Cousteau

Dr. Sylvia Earle

Dr. Birute’ Mary Galdikas

Dr. Jane Goodall, DBE

Dr. David Guggenheim

Dr. Paula Kahumbu, OGW

Ron Magill

Ian Redmond, OBE

Dr. E.O. Wilson

Dr. Patricia C. Wright

David Hamlin

References

External links

Documentary film festivals in the United States
Film festivals established in 2010
Film festivals in New York City